Peter Willemoes (11 May 1783 – 22 March 1808) was a Danish naval officer. He fell in the Battle of Zealand Point. He is commemorated by a statue on the harbourfront in his native town of Assens.

Early life and education

Willemoes was born on 11 May 1783 in Assens on the island of Funen, where his father was a public servant. At the age of twelve he was sent to the Naval Academy in Copenhagen, where he was a mediocre student who chafed under and rebelled against the harsh discipline. He became a cadet in 1795 and sekondløjtnant (second lieutenant) in 1800.

Career
[[File:The Battle of Copenhagen 1801 by Christian Mølsted.jpg|thumb|left|Christian Mølsted: The Battle of Copenhagen. Willemoes is seen putting heart into his men on his floating naval battery. ]]
At seventeen he commanded a floating battery, "Flaadebatteri Nr. 1", during the Battle of Copenhagen on 2 April 1801. After the battle, Willemoes became a member of the Danish Order of Freemasons before setting off to the Mediterranean Sea aboard the frigate Rota.

After his return to Denmark, he began to study law but discontinued his studies in 1807 to briefly go into Russian service.

After the Bombardment of Copenhagen and the British confiscation of the Danish fleet, he returned to Denmark, where he enrolled on Prinds Christian Frederik, the only remaining Danish ship-of-the-line. On 22 March 1808, in the Battle of Zealand Point, the ship was driven onto the sandbar by a British. Willemoes was among the 69 Danish casualties, hit by a bullet to his head, and was afterwards buried at Odden Cemetery.

Reputation and commemoration
 
His indomitable good cheer, courage and good looks combined to make Willemoes an instant celebrity in Northern Europe. Locks of his curly hair became a fashion item among ladies in Copenhagen and he was praised in verse by poet and politician N. F. S. Grundtvig.

The street Willemoesgade in the Østerbro district of Copenhagen was named for him in the 1880s. A statue of him by C. C. Peters was erected on the harbourfront in his native town of Assens in 1902.

A/S Dampskibsselskabet Fiona's fraight ships S/S Peter Willemoes was named for Peter Willemoee in 1902 (built 1888, former name S/S Lundby). A frigate in the Royal Danish Navy is named for him.

References

Further reading
 Kristensen, Rikke: **Noget om søhelten Peter Willemoes og lidt om byen Assens. Museerne på Vestfyn (2008)
 Schultz, Mai-Britt: Peter Willemoes, 1783-1808- En dansk søhelts liv og tid, Assens Kommune (2008)

External links

19th-century Danish naval officers
Danish sailors
Danish military personnel of the Napoleonic Wars
Military personnel killed in the Napoleonic Wars
People from Assens Municipality
1783 births
1808 deaths